TV 101 is an American drama television series that aired on CBS from November 29, 1988 until March 25, 1989. The series stars Sam Robards, Brynn Thayer, Leon Russom and Andrew Cassese. Other notable cast members include Stacey Dash, Teri Polo, Alex Désert and Matt LeBlanc. The music for this show was created and produced by Todd Rundgren.

Synopsis
Recently divorced Kevin Keegan (Robards) is a photojournalist who quits his job and returns to alma mater, Roosevelt High School, to teach journalism. He then teaches his class how to produce a television news program instead of a traditional school newspaper.

Cancellation
The series was scheduled opposite ABC's top 10 hits Who's the Boss? and Roseanne, and NBC's top 20 hit, Matlock. After airing only 13 episodes of the 17 that were produced, TV 101 was canceled due to low ratings and a controversy that erupted when one of the show's characters became pregnant and decided to have an abortion.

Cast

Episodes

References

External links

1988 American television series debuts
1989 American television series endings
1980s American high school television series
1980s American teen drama television series
1980s American workplace drama television series
CBS original programming
English-language television shows
Television series about educators
Television series about journalism
Television series about teenagers
Television series about television
Television shows set in California